"Alone" is a song by Norwegian record producer and DJ Alan Walker. Incorporating uncredited vocals provided by Swedish singer Noonie Bao, it was released commercially for digital download on 2 December 2016. A second part, a collaboration with Ava Max titled "Alone, Pt. II", was released on 27 December 2019. The song garnered critical acclaim upon release.

Background
In a press release on 2 December, Walker stated: "For me, Alone is about cohesion. A song that praises the feeling and comfort of solidarity. When I started making music it was never about to be any [particular], but about creating something for others who could enjoy it with me. What I have experienced by making music and sharing it with [others] are stunning."

Music video
The release of the music video for "Alone" was published on Walker's YouTube channel on 2 December 2016. It has over 1.2 billion views as of October 2021.

The music video explores themes of being alone yet quickly evolves into what seems to be a group effort by Walkers to meet up.

Most of the video was filmed in Norway, focusing on Walker's hometown Bergen, and included panoramic shots of nearby tourist attractions such as Ulriken and Trolltunga in Odda. Some parts were also filmed at prominent locations in Europe, including Berlin, London and Paris.

In connection with the release of his third official single, he recorded the music video at Ulriken mountain in mid-October. For that, he sought and used over 100 Bergen citizens to supernumerary roles in the production, which was made by the Swedish production company Bror Bror.

Alone (Restrung)
On 10 February 2017, Alan Walker published an acoustic version of "Alone", called "Alone (Restrung)", exactly one year after he published "Faded (Restrung)". The official lyric video to "Restrung" was released 16 February.

Track listing

Charts

Weekly charts

Year-end charts

Certifications

Release history

References

External links
 

2016 songs
2016 singles
Number-one singles in Finland
Number-one singles in Norway
Music videos shot in Norway
Number-one singles in Austria
Songs containing the I–V-vi-IV progression
Songs written by Gunnar Greve
Songs written by Jesper Borgen
Songs written by Alan Walker (music producer)
Songs written by Noonie Bao
Alan Walker (music producer) songs
Songs written by Mood Melodies